Anthony Michael Zeno (born October 1, 1957) is an American former professional basketball player. He was a 6'8" (2.03 m) 210 lb. (95 kg) small forward-power forward. He played professionally in the National Basketball Association (NBA) and in Belgium, Israel, France, and most prominently, Italy.

College career
Zeno played college basketball at Arizona State University, with the Sun Devils, from 1975 to 1979.

Professional career
Zeno was selected by the Indiana Pacers, in the second round, with the 32nd overall pick of the 1979 NBA draft. He averaged 1.8 points and 1.8 rebounds per game, in eight games played with the Pacers during the 1979–80 season. Zeno scored 2 points in his very first game with the Pacers.

In 1979, Zeno went to play in the Belgian League, with Maes Pils Mechelen. In November 1980, when Zeno was played with his Belgian team against the Polish club Śląsk Wrocław, he broke a backboard with a slam dunk. After that, he went on to play professionally in the Italian League, and in the Israeli Super League with Hapoel Holon, during the 1988–89 season.

References

External links 
 NBA stats @ basketballreference.com
 RealGM.com Profile
 Italian League Profile 
 French League Profile

1957 births
Living people
American expatriate basketball people in Belgium
American expatriate basketball people in France
American expatriate basketball people in Israel
American expatriate basketball people in Italy
American men's basketball players
AMG Sebastiani Basket players
Arizona State Sun Devils men's basketball players
Basketball players from New Orleans
BCM Gravelines players
Hapoel Holon players
Indiana Pacers draft picks
Indiana Pacers players
Israeli Basketball Premier League players
Power forwards (basketball)
R.C. Mechelen players
Small forwards